The Pauma Complex is a prehistoric archaeological pattern among indigenous peoples of California, initially defined by Delbert L. True in northern San Diego County, California.

The complex is dated generally to the middle Holocene period. This makes it locally the successor to the San Dieguito complex, predecessor to the late prehistoric San Luis Rey Complex, and contemporary with the La Jolla complex on the San Diego County coast. 

Pauma Complex sites have been identified primarily in the San Luis Rey River valley and on the Valley Center plateau to the south of it.

Archaeological traits distinguishing the Pauma Complex include:
 a high frequency of shaped manos
 the presence of finely worked small domed scrapers
 the presence of knives and points
 the presence of discoidals and cogged stones
 a predominance of grinding tools over flaked tools
 a predominance of deep basin metates over slab metates
 a predominance of cobble hammers over core hammers
 a low frequency of cobble tools
 a scarcity of cobble choppers and cobble scrapers
 a predominance of volcanic rock over quartzite as a source material for flaked lithics
 an extreme scarcity of obsidian

References
 True, D. L. 1958. "An Early Complex in San Diego County, California". American Antiquity 23:255-263.
 True, D. L. 1980. "The Pauma Complex in Northern San Diego County: 1978". Journal of New World Archaeology 3(4):1-39.
 True, D. L., and R. Pankey. 1985. "Radiocarbon Dates for the Pauma Complex Component at the Pankey Site, Northern San Diego County, California". Journal of California and Great Basin Anthropology 7:240-244.
 Warren, Claude N., D. L. True, and Ardith A. Eudey. 1961. "Early Gathering Complexes of Western San Diego County: Results and Interpretations of an Archaeological Survey". University of California, Los Angeles, Archaeological Survey Annual Report 1960-1961:1-106.

Archaeology of the United States
Pre-Columbian cultures
Archaeological sites in California
Native American history of California
Indigenous peoples of California